St. Mary's College of Engineering and Technology (SMCET) is a technical institute located in Hyderabad, India. Located in Deshmukhi Village and  8.6 KM from Ramoji Film City Entrance.
In 2010 the All India Council for Technical Education approved collaboration between the St. Mary's College and Marist College to allow students in India to earn a US-recognized MS degree. The college applied for "deemed university" status in 2009 but this status was abolished.

References

External links 
Official Website
St. Mary's Technical Campus Kolkata

Engineering colleges in Hyderabad, India
1996 establishments in Andhra Pradesh
Educational institutions established in 1996